Artūrs Skrastiņš (born 18 September 1974) is a Latvian actor. In the theater, since 1996 he has worked for Dailes teātris. He also has taken part in several films.

In 1998 he received the Latvian National Film Prize Lielais Kristaps for his role in The Mills of Fate (Likteņdzirnas). The same year he also received the best debut award at the Baltijas Pērle film festival.

Filmography

References

External links

Artūrs Skrastiņš at the Dailes teātris homepage

1974 births
Living people
People from Jelgava
Latvian male film actors
Latvian male stage actors
Lielais Kristaps Award winners